Gustavo Rizo Airport  is a domestic airport serving Baracoa, a city in the Cuban province of Guantánamo. The airport receives flights from Havana by Aerogaviota and, formerly, Cubana de Aviación, and it handled over 19,500 passengers in 2013.

History

Infrastructure
Gustavo Rizo Airport has a passenger terminal and a concrete runway, 16/34, with dimensions . The runway is not able to handle flights at night.

Airlines and destinations

Statistics
Gustavo Rizo Airport received 19,524 passengers in 2013, more than it had handled in any past year. Airport officials attributed the rise to Cubana de Aviacion's increase in frequency from two to three weekly flights on its Havana–Baracoa route. The airport also saw 377 aircraft movements in 2013.

References

External links
 

Airports in Cuba
Buildings and structures in Guantánamo Province
Baracoa